There are at least 27 members of the Dipsacales order, Dipsacales, found in Montana.  Some of these species are exotics (not native to Montana) and some species have been designated as Species of Concern.

Honeysuckle
Family: Caprifoliaceae 

Linnaea borealis, twinflower
Lonicera caerulea, western honeysuckle
Lonicera ciliosa, orange honeysuckle
Lonicera involucrata, twinberry honeysuckle
Lonicera morrowii, Morrow's honeysuckle
Lonicera tatarica, Tatarian honeysuckle
Lonicera utahensis, Utah honeysuckle
Sambucus cerulea, blue elderberry
Sambucus racemosa, red elderberry
Symphoricarpos albus, common snowberry
Symphoricarpos occidentalis, western snowberry
Symphoricarpos oreophilus, mountain snowberry
Viburnum edule, squashberry
Viburnum lantana, wayfaring-tree
Viburnum lentago, nannyberry
Viburnum opulus, American cranberrybush

Moschatel
Family: Adoxaceae
Adoxa moschatellina, musk-root

Teasels
Family: Dipsacaceae 
Dipsacus fullonum, fuller's teasel
Knautia arvensis, blue-button

Valerian

Family: Valerianaceae

Plectritis macrocera, white plectritis
Valeriana acutiloba, Cordilleran valerian
Valeriana dioica, wood valerian
Valeriana edulis, hairy valerian
Valeriana occidentalis, small-flower valerian
Valeriana scouleri, Scouler's valerian
Valeriana sitchensis, Sitka valerian
Valerianella locusta, European cornsalad

Further reading

See also
List of dicotyledons of Montana

Notes

Montana
Montana